Aide Iskandar bin Sahak (born 28 May 1975) is a former professional footballer. He was a member of the Singapore national team which won the ASEAN Football Championship in 1998, 2004 and 2007, captaining the team in the latter two editions.

Club career

He spent 10 years with Home United in the S-league before opting to join Johor FA in the Malaysian League in November 2005. He then went on loan at Tampines Rovers for the 2006 season in Singapore. He moved to Geylang United in 2007.

He made it to the latest FIFA Century Club list on 17 May 2007.

On 26 August 2007, Aide insulted referee Sukhbir Singh, reportedly asking, "How much did you bet on the game?" after his team, Geylang United controversially lost to Home United in a league game by conceding two goals in the final five minutes. A ban of five games and a S$2500 fine was imposed on Aide on 4 September. Upon appeal, the FAS reduced his ban to two matches and increased his fine to S$4,000 in November.

Because of that incident, he was dropped from the national team for the game against UAE and missed the World Cup qualifier against Palestine. However, he was recalled into the team pending his appeal on the ban.

International career
Aide made his international debut against New Zealand on 21 February 1995. He scored his first international goal against traditional rivals Malaysia on 3 June 2006. He was inducted into the FIFA Century Club in June 2007.

On 9 November 2007, just hours before the kick off of the World Cup 2010 qualifiers against Tajikistan, he sensationally retired from international football. Indra Sahdan Daud took over as the new national team captain.

Coaching career

In April 2008, it was announced that Aide would become the Technical Director of a proposed A.C. Milan Junior School which would begin operations in Singapore late 2008. Aide is a fan of the Italian Serie A club.

Aide joined Sengkang Punggol for the 2009 S.League season as a player cum assistant coach, in a similar position as Mirko Grabovac the previous season. Coach Jorg Steinebrunner was sacked by the club and Aide was appointed caretaker coach.

Aide was appointed head coach of Courts Young Lions in January 2013. The Young Lions recorded their first league victory only in August, finishing wooden spoonist in his maiden season. With the resignation of V. Sundramoorthy, Aide took over the reins of the Singapore national under-23 football team in October 2013. He guided them to third place at the 2013 Southeast Asian Games.

Following Singapore's 1-0 loss to Indonesia at the 2015 SEA Games, Singapore failed to advance into the semi-finals. Aide consequently resigned as coach of the national under-23 football team.

He was appointed the technical director of Geylang International in 2016.

Personal life

Aide married Ezreen Taib Zohri on 7 May 2000. They have three children – sons Andre (born 2001) and Adiel (born 2004), and daughter Estee (born 2007). He is the older brother of Kedah FA
head coach, Aidil Sharin Sahak.

Honours

Player
Home United
S.League: 1999, 2003
Singapore Cup: 2000, 2001, 2003, 2005

Tampines Rovers
Singapore Cup: 2006

Singapore
ASEAN Football Championship: 1998, 2004, 2007
Southeast Asian Games
Bronze medal – 1995

Manager
Singapore U-23
Southeast Asian Games
Bronze medal – 2013

See also
 List of men's footballers with 100 or more international caps

References

Singaporean footballers
Singapore Premier League players
Singapore international footballers
Singaporean expatriate footballers
Expatriate footballers in Malaysia
Tampines Rovers FC players
FIFA Century Club
1975 births
Living people
Singaporean football managers
Singapore Premier League head coaches
Hougang United FC head coaches
Hougang United FC players
Home United FC players
Geylang International FC players
Young Lions FC head coaches
Association football central defenders